Xie Fei (born August 14, 1942) is a Chinese film director. Xie was born in Yan'an city of Shaanxi Province, China.

A graduate of the Beijing Film Academy, Xie has also taught at his almamater as a vice-president of that institution.

Selected films

References

External links

Xie Fei at the Chinese Movie Database

Film directors from Shaanxi
Beijing Film Academy alumni
People from Yan'an
1942 births
Living people
Beijing No. 4 High School alumni
Directors of Golden Bear winners